The 1953 state election in Queensland, Australia was held on 7 March 1953.

By-elections
 On 18 November 1950, Mick Brosnan (Labor) was elected to succeed Samuel Brassington (Labor), who had died on 4 October 1950, as the member for Fortitude Valley.
 On 3 March 1951, John Dufficy (Labor) was elected to succeed Harry O'Shea (Labor), who had died on 4 November 1950, as the member for Warrego.
 On 14 April 1951, Eric Lloyd (Labor) was elected to succeed Bruce Pie (Liberal), who had resigned on 6 January 1951, as the member for Kedron.
 On 5 April 1952, Leonard Eastment was elected to succeed Ned Hanlon (Labor),  who had died on 15 January 1952, as the member for Ithaca.
 On 25 October 1952, Viv Cooper (Labor) was elected to succeed Walter Ingram (Labor), who had died on 24 July 1952, as the member for Keppel.

Retiring Members

Labor
Thomas Dunstan MLA (Nash)

Country
Duncan MacDonald MLA (Somerset)
Malcolm McIntyre MLA (Cunningham)

Liberal
Louis Luckins MLA (Norman)

Candidates
Sitting members at the time of the election are shown in bold text.

See also
 1953 Queensland state election
 Members of the Queensland Legislative Assembly, 1950–1953
 Members of the Queensland Legislative Assembly, 1953–1956
 List of political parties in Australia

References
 

Candidates for Queensland state elections